Randy Lynn Scruggs (August 3, 1953 – April 17, 2018) was an American music producer, songwriter and guitarist. He had his first recording at the age of 13. He won four Grammy Awards and was named Musician of the Year at the Country Music Association Awards three times. He was the middle son of Earl Scruggs and Louise Scruggs.

Career
As a songwriter, Scruggs's credits include "We Danced Anyway", "Love Don't Care (Whose Heart It Breaks)", "Love Has No Right", "Don't Make It Easy for Me", "Chance of Lovin' You", and "Angel in Disguise".

Scruggs worked with many artists, including Michael Card, The Talbot Brothers, Waylon Jennings, Earl Thomas Conley, George Strait and Emmylou Harris. His career began in 1970 with the release of All the Way Home, a collaboration with his older brother Gary. Scruggs recorded his debut solo LP Crown of Jewels in 1998. He played the electric bass on John Hartford's 1971 album Aereo-Plain.

In 1972, Scruggs released another album recorded with Gary: The Scruggs Brothers. Reviewing in Christgau's Record Guide: Rock Albums of the Seventies (1981), Robert Christgau said: "Significant that two musicians so close to the Flatt-picking roots—though it ought to be remembered that their father is an entertainer, not a mountaineer—have put together such a doleful-sounding country-rock band in the face of the good-time sippin'-that-wine stuff the more famous guys are selling."

In 1994, Scruggs teamed with Earl Scruggs and Doc Watson to contribute the song "Keep on the Sunny Side" to the AIDS benefit album Red Hot + Country produced by the Red Hot Organization.

Scruggs died after a short illness on April 17, 2018 at the age of 64.

Awards and Honors

2002 Best Country Instrumental Performance: Earl Scruggs, Gary Scruggs, Randy Scruggs, Steve Martin, Leon Russell, Vince Gill, Jerry Douglas, Glen Duncan, Albert Lee, Paul Shaffer and Marty Stuart – "Foggy Mountain Breakdown"

Discography

Albums

Singles

References

External links

1953 births
2018 deaths
People from Nashville, Tennessee
American country guitarists
American male guitarists
American country singer-songwriters
Grammy Award winners
Singer-songwriters from Tennessee
Guitarists from Tennessee
20th-century American guitarists
Country musicians from Tennessee
20th-century American male musicians
American male singer-songwriters